The 2010–11 A-League was the 34th season of top-flight soccer in Australia, and the sixth season of the Australian A-League soccer competition since its establishment in 2004. The home and away season began on 5 August 2010 and concluded on 13 February 2011. The addition of Melbourne Heart brought the total number of teams to 11. Brisbane Roar finished Premiers with two games remaining in the season following an Australian record unbeaten run, and later completed the Premiership and Championship double by beating the Central Coast Mariners in the Grand Final.

Rule changes
A new rule at the start of the season allows for two marquee players to be signed without salary cap restraints so long as one is Australian with a certain number of qualifications to be determined by FFA. This replaces the previous ruling of only one salary cap exempt player in previous seasons.

Clubs

Transfers

Managerial changes

Foreign players

The following do not fill a Visa position:
1Those players who were born and started their professional career abroad but have since gained Australian Residency (and New Zealand Residency, in the case of Wellington Phoenix);
2Australian residents (and New Zealand residents, in the case of Wellington Phoenix) who have chosen to represent another national team;
3Injury Replacement Players, or National Team Replacement Players;
4Guest Players (eligible to play a maximum of ten games)

Salary cap exemptions and captains

Regular season

Home and away season
The 2010–11 A-League season had each team play 30 matches over 27 rounds. The regular season started on Thursday, 5 August 2010 and ended on Sunday, 13 February 2011. The opening game was played at the new Melbourne Rectangular Stadium (AAMI Park) and marked the A-League debut of the new franchise, Melbourne Heart. Mid week games were played to accommodate this extra team. The official 2010–11 fixture list was released on 18 May 2010.

Round 1

Round 2

Round 3

Round 4

Round 5

Round 6

Round 7

Round 8

Round 9

Round 10

Round 11

Round 12

Round 13

Round 14

Round 15

Round 16

Round 17

Round 18

Round 19

Round 20

Round 21

Round 22

Round 23

Round 24

Round 25

Round 26

Round 27

Notes

Table of results

Finals series

Semi-finals

Preliminary final

Grand Final

Season statistics

Top scorers

Own goals

Attendance 
These are the attendance records of each of the teams at the end of the home and away season. The table does not include finals series attendances. 

Updated to the end of season.

 A Gold Coast United match held on 19 December 2010 was postponed due to the poor playing surface of the pitch and torrential rain after the 21st minute of the game had been played. Spectators were allowed free entry prior to the postponement, of which there were 10,146 in attendance of the 21,000+ who applied for the free tickets. The abandoned game's attendance is not taken into account.

Top 10 Attendances

Discipline
The Fair Play Award will go to the team with the lowest points on the fair play ladder at the conclusion of the home and away season. It was awarded to Premiers Brisbane Roar who beat last year's Champions Sydney FC by 6 points.

Updated to End of Week 27 (End of Regular Season)

Awards

End-of-season awards
 Johnny Warren Medal –  Marcos Flores
 NAB Young Footballer of the Year –  Mathew Ryan
 Golden Boot Award –  Sergio Van Dijk
 Goalkeeper of the Year –  Michael Theoklitos
 Manager of the Year –  Ange Postecoglou
 Fair Play Award – Brisbane Roar
 Referee of the Year – Matthew Breeze
 Foreign Player of the Year –  Marcos Flores
 Solo Goal of the Year –  Erik Paartalu

All-Star team
Formation: 4–3–3

See also
 2010 Australian football code crowds
 2011 Australian football code crowds

Team season articles

 2010–11 Adelaide United FC season
 2010–11 Brisbane Roar FC season
 2010–11 Central Coast Mariners FC season
 2010–11 Gold Coast United FC season
 2010–11 Melbourne Heart FC season
 2010–11 Melbourne Victory FC season
 2010–11 Newcastle Jets FC season
 2010–11 North Queensland Fury FC season
 2010–11 Perth Glory FC season
 2010–11 Sydney FC season
 2010–11 Wellington Phoenix FC season
 Official season draw

Notes

References

 
A-League Men seasons
Aus
1
1